Mara Stefania Gómez (born 7 March 1997) is an Argentine footballer who plays as a striker for Estudiantes. She is the first transgender player to play in the Argentine top flight.

Career
After signing for Primera División side Villa San Carlos, she had her debut in 2020 in a 1–7 loss against Lanús. Her debut marked the first time an openly trans athlete competed in the first division of Argentine football (male or female). 

In 2022, Gómez signed for Primera División side Estudiantes de La Plata, becoming the first transgender player to play in an Argentine top flight.

References

External links
Mara Gómez at EdeLP 

1997 births
Argentine LGBT sportspeople
Argentine women's footballers
Argentine transgender people
Living people
Transgender sportswomen
Women's association football forwards